The 1942 season of the Paraguayan Primera División, the top category of Paraguayan football, was played by 10 teams. The national champions were Nacional.

Results

Standings

National title play-off

External links
Paraguay 1942 season at RSSSF

Para
Paraguayan Primera División seasons
Primera